The Lower-Rhine urnfield culture originated in the area of the Rhine river in the late Bronze Age . It was part of the wider Urnfield culture.

Urnfield culture
Archaeological cultures of Central Europe
Archaeological cultures of Western Europe
Bronze Age cultures of Europe
Archaeological cultures in Germany
Archaeological cultures in the Netherlands